Saul S. Sherman (September 25, 1917 – October 10, 2010) was a professional American football quarterback in the National Football League. Born in Chicago, Illinois, he played two seasons for the Chicago Bears.

Career
Sherman played collegiately for the University of Chicago, initially as a halfback, before converting to quarterback his senior year. It was during his time at UChicago that he had learned the T-formation, at the time a novel offensive scheme, from Maroons head coach Clark Shaughnessy. Sherman only played two seasons in the pros before he retired to go fight in World War II, but not before he helped teach the T-formation to his Bears teammate, future Pro Football Hall of Famer Sid Luckman, who would go on to use the T to revolutionize the NFL's passing game and quarterback the Bears to four NFL championships. This remains arguably Sherman's most lasting legacy in pro football.

References
Solly Sherman's obituary

1917 births
2010 deaths
Players of American football from Chicago
American football quarterbacks
Chicago Maroons football players
Chicago Bears players
Jewish American sportspeople
21st-century American Jews